Gnomeo & Juliet is a 2011  computer-animated romantic comedy film directed by Kelly Asbury from a screenplay by Rob Sprackling and John Smith. It is loosely based on the play Romeo and Juliet by William Shakespeare and features the voices of James McAvoy, Emily Blunt, Michael Caine, Jason Statham, Maggie Smith, Ashley Jensen, Stephen Merchant, Matt Lucas, Jim Cummings, Julie Walters, Richard Wilson, Patrick Stewart, and Ozzy Osbourne. The story follows Gnomeo and Juliet, a pair of garden gnomes who fall in love, but due to the feud between their respective families, they must find a way to keep their blossoming romance a secret.

Gnomeo & Juliet premiered at the El Capitan Theatre in Hollywood on January 23, 2011, and was theatrically released on February 11 by Entertainment One Films in the United Kingdom and Touchstone Pictures in the United States. The film grossed $193 million worldwide and received nominations for several Annie Awards. The song "Hello Hello" by Elton John and Lady Gaga was nominated for the Golden Globe Award for Best Original Song, the Satellite Award for Best Original Song, and the Critics' Choice Movie Award for Best Song. A sequel, Sherlock Gnomes, was released in 2018 by Paramount Pictures and Metro-Goldwyn-Mayer.

Plot
In Stratford-upon-Avon, elder neighbours Miss Montague and Mr. Capulet despise each other. When they leave their respective gardens, their garden gnomes and other lawn ornaments come to life. The Montague garden is filled with blue-hatted gnomes led by Lady Bluebury, and the Capulet garden is filled with red-hatted gnomes led by Lord Redbrick, who share in their owners’ feud. In a back-alley lawnmower race, Lady Bluebury's son Gnomeo competes against his Red rival Tybalt, who destroys Gnomeo's lawnmower. That night, Gnomeo and his best friend Benny infiltrate the red garden in disguise and vandalize Tybalt's mower, but Benny instead vandalizes Tybalt's pedestal and accidentally triggers a security light. During their escape, Gnomeo ends up in an abandoned garden nearby and bumps into a disguised Juliet, daughter of Lord Redbrick, who dislikes her father's overprotective nature and is attempting to retrieve a unique Cupid's Arrow orchid from the roof of the greenhouse. The two are enthralled by each other and a flirty fight for the flower ensues, culminating in the pair falling into a pond and discovering each other's colors. Shocked, Juliet flees home and tells her frog-sprinkler friend Nanette about her newfound love. Nanette declares it romantically tragic but agrees to keep it a secret.

Gnomeo and Juliet continue to meet secretly in the nearby garden, where they encounter a pink plastic flamingo named Featherstone who encourages their love. Lord Redbrick pairs Juliet with a Red gnome named Paris, but Juliet distracts him with Nanette, who quickly falls for him. Lady Bluebury is distraught after the Reds infiltrate the garden and destroy the plant nurtured by Gnomeo's late father in retaliation for Gnomeo's earlier actions. The Blues urge Gnomeo to take revenge on the Reds, and he is about to spray their prized tulips with insecticide when Juliet sees him and he backs out upon seeing her upset with his actions. At their next meeting, Gnomeo and Juliet argue until Featherstone tells them about how he lost his own love when the couple living in the garden's house broke up and they each took a flamingo.

Benny sees them and runs into the alleyway, unaware that Tybalt (who wants revenge for his pedestal being vandalized) is waiting with his lawnmower; he attempts to run Benny down, but Gnomeo intervenes. They fight until the lawnmower runs into the wall, shattering Tybalt. Blaming Gnomeo for the incident, the Reds attack him, who soon ends up in the road and a blue teapot falls from a passing truck, leading everyone to believe Gnomeo has been run over. Lord Redbrick takes Juliet back to the garden and has her feet glued to her tower for her own safety. Gnomeo's mushroom friend, Shroom, discovers that Gnomeo is still alive and being carried off by a dog to a nearby park. He and Featherstone reach the park, where Gnomeo climbs onto a statue of William Shakespeare and tells him his story. Shakespeare notes that Gnomeo's tale is similar to his own story of Romeo and Juliet and predicts that Gnomeo's will have a tragic ending as well.

Benny uses Miss Montague's computer to order a powerful Terrafirminator lawnmower (falling in love with a porcelain doll in the process), seeking revenge on the Reds. The Terrafirminator arrives and initially works well, but goes out of control, destroying both gardens, and gets itself stuck while the gnomes wage a full-scale war. Gnomeo returns to Juliet with Featherstone's help, but the Terrafirminator frees itself. Gnomeo is unable to free Juliet but refuses to leave her, and they share a passionate kiss as the lawnmower crashes into the tower and self-destructs, seemingly killing them both. Realizing the consequences of their vendetta, Lady Blueberry and Lord Redbrick reconcile and end their feud. Gnomeo and Juliet emerge from the ruins unscathed as the two clans celebrate, in which Tybalt gets rebuilt and Featherstone gets his mate back. Everyone happily sees the couple off as they get married and drive away on a lawnmower.

Cast
 James McAvoy as Gnomeo, Lady Bluebury's son and Juliet's love interest. He is based on Romeo Montague.
 Emily Blunt as Juliet, Lord Redbrick's daughter and Gnomeo's love interest. She is based on Juliet Capulet.
 Michael Caine as Lord Redbrick, leader of the Red gnomes and Juliet's widowed father. He is based on Lord Capulet.
 Jason Statham as Tybalt, Gnomeo and Benny's nemesis. He is based on the character of the same name.
 Maggie Smith as Lady Bluebury, leader of the Blue gnomes and Gnomeo's widowed mother. She is based on Lord and Lady Montague.
 Ashley Jensen as Nanette, a Scottish plastic garden frog, Paris' love interest and Juliet's best friend. She is based on Nurse.
 Stephen Merchant as Paris, a nerdy red gnome who was arranged to marry Juliet, and Nanette's love interest. He is based on Count Paris.
 Matt Lucas as Benny, Gnomeo's best friend. He is based on both Mercutio and Benvolio, though the fate of his hat being smashed by Tybalt before the film's climax is similar to the former's.
 Jim Cummings as Featherstone, a lonely plastic flamingo with a Spanish accent. He is based on Friar Laurence.
 Julie Walters as Ms. Montague, the elderly owner of the Blue garden.
 Richard Wilson as Mr. Capulet, the elderly owner of the Red garden. 
 Patrick Stewart as a statue of William Shakespeare, the author of Romeo and Juliet. 
 Ozzy Osbourne as Fawn, a miniature deer statue and Tybalt's best friend. 
 Hulk Hogan as Terrafirminator Announcer, an unseen person who promotes the Terrafirminator lawnmower. 
 Kelly Asbury as Red Goon Gnomes, a group of miniature gnomes who act as servants to Lord Redbrick and the other Red gnomes. They are based on Gregory, Sampson, Anthony, and Potpan. 
 Dolly Parton as Dolly Gnome, the lawnmower race announcer. 
James Daniel Wilson as Fishing Gnome, a red gnome. 
Tim Bentinck and Neil McCaul as Conjoined Gnomes. 
Julio Bonet as Mankini Gnome, Dolly Gnome's love interest.
Julia Braams as a stone fish attached to the fishing line of the Fishing Gnome.
 Maurissa Horwitz as an unnamed Porcelain doll, Benny's love interest.

Production
The film was the original idea of Sprackling and Smith, who sold the spec script to Disney through Rocket Pictures. Disney studio chairman Dick Cook greenlit the film, under the Disney-owned Miramax Films. Miramax was later sold by Disney in 2010, but the latter studio retained the rights to the film. Starz Animation produced and animated the film. After first sitting on the film as it was an animated film not by a Disney animation unit, Disney Studios then opted to release the film through its Touchstone Pictures banner. Australian director Adam Elliot was approached and asked to direct the film, but he rejected the offer due to the film's incompatibility with his style, as well as his lack of experience with CGI.

Asbury got on board in 2006, and was attracted to the movie in order to work with Elton John. Asbury and Hamilton Shaw then rewrote the film "sort of from scratch,"  A particular challenge, according to Asbury was how to differentiate the ending between the original play and the movie in order to "keep daggers and poison and suicide out". Asbury had free range of the casting and conducted the process only through listening to voices, not knowing which actor was auditioning until he felt they were right for the character. Prior to the casting of James McAvoy and Emily Blunt, the roles of Gnomeo and Juliet were originally to be voiced by Ewan McGregor and Kate Winslet, respectively.

Music 

Gnomeo & Juliet: Original Soundtrack is the soundtrack album and was released by Buena Vista Records on February 8, 2011. It features music by Elton John (who was also the film's executive producer), Nelly Furtado, Kiki Dee, and selections from the score composed by Chris P. Bacon and James Newton Howard (who played keyboards for Elton John and arranged strings on many previous projects).

The duet of John and Lady Gaga for "Hello, Hello" was featured in the film, released on February 11, 2011, but the soundtrack version only features John. Additionally, on May 4, 2011, the duet was leaked online and available for download on most sharing websites.

Release
Gnomeo & Juliets worldwide premiere was at El Capitan Theatre in Hollywood on January 23, 2011. The film was released by Walt Disney Studios Motion Pictures under the Touchstone Pictures banner on February 11, 2011. The film was Touchstone's first animated film since 1993's The Nightmare Before Christmas and also Touchstone's first and only film to receive a G rating from the MPAA. The film was distributed by Disney worldwide except for a few countries like the United Kingdom and Canada, where Entertainment One Films released the movie. Elton John and director Asbury presented 10 minutes of the film at the Cannes Film Festival.

Home media
Gnomeo & Juliet was released by Touchstone Home Entertainment on Blu-ray 3D, Blu-ray, and DVD on May 24, 2011.  The film was produced as three different packages: a 1-disc DVD, a 2-disc Blu-ray/DVD combo pack, and a 3-disc Blu-ray 3D, Blu-ray, and DVD combo pack. The 3-disc package also includes access to a digital download of the film. Both the DVD and Blu-ray versions of the release include the music video for Elton John and Nelly Furtado's version of John's "Crocodile Rock", as well as the extras "Elton Builds a Garden" and "Frog Talk" with Ashley Jensen. In addition, the Blu-ray version also has several deleted and alternate scenes, as well as a feature with Ozzy Osbourne called "The Fawn of Darkness".

Reception

Critical response
The website's critical consensus reads, "While it has moments of inspiration, Gnomeo & Juliet is often too self-referential for its own good." On Metacritic, it has a score of 53 out of 100, based on 28 reviews, indicating "mixed or average reviews". Audiences surveyed by CinemaScore gave the film a grade B+ on scale of A+ to F.

Joe Morgenstern of The Wall Street Journal gave it a positive review, "This lively little film, a comic take on Shakespeare's tragedy, is really entertaining." Ty Burr of the Boston Globe says "It has its own bizarre charms and a breezy confidence that renders it the very definition of a simple pleasure." Justin Chang of Variety writes "A welcome dose of honest silliness at a time when most family-oriented toons settle for smart-alecky."

In a mixed review Tasha Robinson from The A.V. Club criticizes the film "Far too much of the film is devoted to eye-rolling pop-culture gags and long montages set to recycled Elton John songs."

Box office
Gnomeo and Juliet earned about $100 million in North America and $94 million in other countries, for a worldwide total of $193.9 million. Gnomeo & Juliet was ultimately a hit for Disney, outperforming the much higher-budgeted (and eventual box office bomb) Mars Needs Moms the studio released a month following Gnomeo & Juliet. On the first weekend of its US release, the film had a worldwide opening of $30,700,000, finishing in second place behind Just Go with It ($35,800,000). On its second weekend —Presidents' Day weekend— it topped the worldwide box office (without being in first place either in North America or internationally) with $29,800,000, ahead of Unknown which ranked second ($26,400,000).

It opened in 2,994 theaters in North America on Friday, February 11, 2011, grossing $6,200,000 on its first day and ranking third behind Justin Bieber: Never Say Never and Just Go with It. It then finished the weekend with $25,400,000 in 3rd place. However, it scored the largest opening weekend ever for an animated feature released during the winter period (both January and February). It also made the largest debut on record for a minor animated movie (i.e., one with little status, expectations or built-in audience), according to Box Office Mojo. With a $99,970,000 total it became the highest-grossing animated feature among those released in winter, until it was surpassed by The Lego Movie in 2014.

In the United Kingdom, Ireland, and Malta, it topped the weekend box office by earning £2,900,000 ($4,700,000) on its opening. In total it has grossed $25,300,000, making the UK the only market, except North America, where it grossed more than $10,000,000.

Accolades

Sequel
In March 2012, it was reported that a sequel titled Sherlock Gnomes was in development at Rocket Pictures. Andy Riley and Kevin Cecil, two of the nine writers on the first film, were writing the script for the sequel. Steve Hamilton Shaw and David Furnish produced the film, and Elton John was an executive producer, and again composed songs for the film. The film featured Sherlock Gnomes, "the greatest ornamental detective" hired by the characters from the first film, to solve the mystery of disappearing gnomes. John Stevenson, director of Kung Fu Panda, directed the sequel, and Johnny Depp voiced Sherlock Gnomes. The film was released March 23, 2018. Unlike the original, it was released by Paramount Pictures and Metro-Goldwyn-Mayer.

References

External links

 
 
 
 https://www.scripts.com/script/gnomeo_and_juliet_9045

2011 films
2011 3D films
2011 animated films
2011 computer-animated films
2010s American animated films
2010s British animated films
2010s children's animated films
2010s English-language films
2011 romantic comedy films
2010s children's comedy films
2011 comedy films
American children's animated comedy films
American children's animated fantasy films
American children's animated musical films
American computer-animated films
American romantic comedy films
British 3D films
British animated fantasy films
British children's comedy films
British children's fantasy films
British computer-animated films
British romantic comedy films
Canadian animated comedy films
Canadian animated fantasy films
Canadian musical films
Canadian computer-animated films
Canadian romantic comedy films
2010s children's fantasy films
Elton John
Fictional couples
2010s fantasy comedy films
Films about gnomes
Films based on Romeo and Juliet
Films set in England
Rocket Pictures films
Touchstone Pictures animated films
Films based on works by William Shakespeare
Films directed by Kelly Asbury
Films scored by James Newton Howard
Animated adaptations of William Shakespeare
3D animated films
Films about prejudice
Modern adaptations of works by William Shakespeare
2010s Canadian films
2010s British films
Lady Gaga